Joseph Bologne (1871–1959) was a Belgian socialist politician.

He was elected on 22 May 1910 as representative for Namur, although he lived in Liège. He served until 1932, when he became senator.

He became mayor of Liège in 1940.

1871 births
1959 deaths
Politicians from Liège
Walloon movement activists